Raclopride is a typical antipsychotic. It acts as a selective antagonist on D2 dopamine receptors. It has been used in trials studying Parkinson Disease.

Its selectivity to the cerebral D2 receptors is characterized by its respective Ki-values, which are as follows: 1.8, 3.5, 2400 and 18000 nM for D2, D3, D4 and D1 receptors respectively.

It can be radiolabelled with radioisotopes, e.g. 3H or 11C and used as a tracer for in vitro imaging (autoradiography) as well as in vivo imaging positron emission tomography (PET). Images obtained by cerebral PET scanning (e.g. PET/CT or PET/MRI) allow the non-invasive assessment of the binding capacity of the cerebral D2 dopamine receptor, which can be useful for the diagnosis of movement disorders. In particular, cerebral D2 receptor binding as measured by carbon-11-raclopride (11C-raclopride) has shown to reflect disease severity of Huntington's disease, a genetic disease characterized by selective degeneration of cerebral D2 receptors.

Other studies have investigated the relationship of D2 receptor binding capacity and personality disorders. One study found decreased binding in the detachment personality trait. Radiolabelled raclopride is also commonly used to determine the efficacy and neurotoxicity of dopaminergic drugs.

References

Benzamides
Chloroarenes
D2 antagonists
Phenol ethers
Pyrrolidines
Typical antipsychotics